In fluid mechanics, the Okubo–Weiss parameter, (normally given by "W") is a measure of the relative importance of deformation and rotation at a given point. It is calculated as the sum of the squares of normal and shear strain minus the relative vorticity.  This is widely applicable in fluid properties particularly in identifying and describing oceanic eddies.  

For a horizontally non-divergent flow in the ocean, the parameter is given by:

where:
  is the normal strain.
  is the shear strain.
  is the relative vorticity.

References
 Okubo, A., 1970: Horizontal dispersion of floatable particles in the vicinity of velocity singularities such as convergences. Deep-Sea Res., 17, 445–454
 Weiss, J., 1991: The dynamics of enstrophy transfer in two-dimensional hydrodynamics. PhysicaD, 48, 273–294

Fluid dynamics
Continuum mechanics